Óscar Lozano (born 29 September 1928) is a Mexican former sports shooter. He competed in the 50 m rifle event at the 1948 Summer Olympics.

References

External links
 

1928 births
Possibly living people
Mexican male sport shooters
Olympic shooters of Mexico
Shooters at the 1948 Summer Olympics
Sportspeople from Monterrey